Lipoltice is a municipality and village in Pardubice District in the Pardubice Region of the Czech Republic. It has about 400 inhabitants.

Administrative parts
Villages of Pelechov and Sovoluská Lhota are administrative parts of Lipoltice.

References

External links

Villages in Pardubice District